John Clement Favalora (born December 5, 1935) is an American prelate of the Catholic Church. He served as archbishop of the Archdiocese of Miami from 1994 to 2010 and as bishop of the Diocese of Alexandria in Louisiana from 1986 to 1989 and as bishop of the Diocese of St. Petersburg in Florida from 1989 to 1994

Biography

Early life 
Favalora was born on December 5, 1935, in New Orleans, Louisiana, where he graduated from Jesuit High School in 1954. He studied for the priesthood at St. Joseph Seminary in St. Benedict, Louisiana; Notre Dame Seminary in New Orleans; then the Pontifical Gregorian University and the Pontifical North American College in Rome earning his bachelor degree in philosophy and history.

Priesthood 
Favalora was ordained into the priesthood in Rome by Archbishop Martin O’Connor for the Archdiocese of New Orleans on December 20, 1961.  After returning to New Orleans, he obtained certification as a secondary school teacher from Xavier University in New Orleans. Subsequently, he attended Catholic University of America in Washington, D.C., and obtained a Master of Education degree from Tulane University in New Orleans.

Favalora served as assistant pastor of St. Theresa of the Child Jesus Parish in Duson, Louisiana, from 1962 to 1970. In addition to his duties at St. Theresa, Favalora served as vice rector of St. John Vianney Preparatory School in New Orleans in 1964 and, in 1968, was appointed principal. In 1973, Favalora began a six-year stint as pastor of St. Angela Merici Parish in Metairie, Louisiana. In 1979, he was named director of the Office of Vocations. Beginning in 1981, he was appointed rector/president of Notre Dame Seminary, a position he held for the five years before his consecration as bishop.

Bishop of Alexandria 

Pope John Paul II appointed Favalora as the ninth bishop of the Diocese of Alexandria on June 24, 1986. Favalora was consecrated on July 29, 1986, at St. Francis Xavier Cathedral in Alexandria. Archbishop Pio Laghi served as principal consecrator with Archbishop Philip Hannan and Bishop William Friend serving as principal co-consecrators.

Bishop of St. Petersburg 
On March 14, 1989, Favalora was appointed by John Paul II as the third bishop of the Diocese of St. Petersburg. Favalora was installed on May 16, 1989.

Archbishop of Miami 
On November 3, 1994, Favalora was appointed by John Paul II as the third archbishop of the Archdiocese of Miami. Favarola was installed on December 20, 1994 at the Cathedral of Saint Mary in Miami.

Favalora has served as a board member of The Catholic University of America in Washington, D.C. and St. Vincent de Paul Regional Seminary in Boynton Beach. He has also served as state chaplain and a member of the Knights of Columbus in Florida, in addition to being president of the Florida Catholic Conference. Favalora has been a member of the USCCB committees on Priestly Life and Ministry, Sexual Abuse and Pro-Life issues.

Favalora adopted the charter for the Protection of Children and Young People after being deposed and settling cases during the sexual abuse scandal in the archdiocese.

Retirement 
Pope Benedict XVI accepted Favarola's resignation as archbishop of Miami on  April 20, 2010, eight months before he reached the mandatory retirement age of seventy-five.

Episcopal lineage 
 Cardinal Scipione Rebiba
 Cardinal Giulio Antonio Santorio (1566)
 Cardinal Girolamo Bernerio, OP (1586)
 Archbishop Galeazzo Sanvitale (1604)
 Cardinal Ludovico Ludovisi (1621)
 Cardinal Luigi Caetani (1622)
 Cardinal Ulderico Carpegna (1630)
 Cardinal Paluzzo Paluzzi Altieri degli Albertoni (1666)
 Pope Benedict XIII (1675)
 Pope Benedict XIV (1724)
 Pope Clement XIII (1743)
 Cardinal Marcantonio Colonna (1762)
 Cardinal Hyacinthe Sigismond Gerdil, CRSP (1777)
 Cardinal Giulio Maria della Somaglia (1788)
 Cardinal Carlo Odescalchi, SJ (1823)
 Cardinal Costantino Patrizi Naro (1828)
 Cardinal Lucido Parocchi (1871)
 Pope Pius X (1884)
 Cardinal Gaetano De Lai (1911)
 Cardinal Raffaele Rossi, OCD(1920)
 Cardinal Amleto Giovanni Cicognani (1933)
 Archbishop Pio Laghi (1969)
 Archbishop John Favalora (1986)

See also

 

 Catholic Church hierarchy
 Catholic Church in the United States
 Historical list of the Catholic bishops of the United States
 List of Catholic bishops of the United States
 Lists of patriarchs, archbishops, and bishops

References

External links

Roman Catholic Archdiocese of Miami

Episcopal succession

1935 births
Living people
20th-century Roman Catholic archbishops in the United States
21st-century Roman Catholic archbishops in the United States
Roman Catholic archbishops of Miami
Jesuit High School (New Orleans) alumni
Notre Dame Seminary alumni
People from New Orleans
Pontifical Gregorian University alumni
Roman Catholic Archdiocese of Miami
Roman Catholic bishops of Saint Petersburg
Roman Catholic bishops of Alexandria
Roman Catholic Ecclesiastical Province of New Orleans
Catholic University of America alumni
Catholic University of America trustees
Tulane University alumni
Xavier University of Louisiana alumni